The following is a list of Middle Tennessee Blue Raiders men's basketball head coaches. There have been 20 head coaches of the Blue Raiders in their 100-season history.

Middle Tennessee's current head coach is Nick McDevitt. He was hired as the Blue Raiders' head coach in March 2018, replacing Kermit Davis, who left to become the head coach at Ole Miss.

References

Middle Tennessee

Middle Tennessee basketball, men's, coaches